Siolmatra is a genus of flowering plants belonging to the family Cucurbitaceae.

Its native range is Southern Tropical America.

Species
Species:

Siolmatra brasiliensis 
Siolmatra pentaphylla

References

Cucurbitaceae
Cucurbitaceae genera